Thomas Mansel, 1st Baron Mansel PC (9 November 1667 – 10 December 1723) was a Welsh nobleman and politician who sat in the English and British House of Commons from 1689 until 1712, when he was raised to the peerage as Baron Mansel as one of Harley's Dozen and sat in the House of Lords.

Early life
Mansel was the son of Sir Edward Mansel, 4th Baronet, of Margam Abbey, Glamorgan, Wales, sometime Member of Parliament for Glamorganshire, and his wife Martha Carne. Mansel's great-grandfather was Henry Montagu, 1st Earl of Manchester. He was educated at Jesus College, Oxford, and graduated with a B.A. in 1686 and by 1699 he was awarded his Master of Arts. On 18 May 1686 he married Martha Millington, daughter of Francis Millington, merchant, of London and Newick Place, Sussex.

Political career
In 1689 Mansel ran for, and won the Welsh Parliamentary seat of Cardiff, as a Tory MP. Although Mansel held the seat until 1698, it wasn't until he won the seat of Glamorgan in 1699 that he began to gain higher political offices. In 1701 he held the office of High Sheriff of Glamorgan.  In 1704 he was given the post of Vice-Admiral of South Wales and the same year he was appointed Comptroller of the Household to Queen Anne, a position he held until 1708. Whilst Comptroller of the Household, Mansel was invested as a Privy Council.  On the death of his father on 17 November 1706, he succeeded to the baronetcy. From 1710 to 1711 he was a Commissioner of the Treasury. On 1 January 1712, he was raised to the peerage as Baron Mansel of Margam, and vacated his seat in the House of Commons to sit in the House of Lords. From 1712 to 1714, he was Teller of the Exchequer.

Death and legacy
Mansel died on 10 December 1723 and was buried at Margam. He and his wife had six children, including Robert Mansel (1695–1723), MP (who predeceased his father by a few months), Christopher Mansel, 3rd Baron Mansel and Bussy Mansel, 4th Baron Mansel.

Sources

Welsh Biography Online

1668 births
1723 deaths
1
Peers of Great Britain created by Queen Anne
Alumni of Jesus College, Oxford
Mansel, Thomas, 5th Baronet
Members of the Privy Council of England
Members of the Privy Council of Great Britain
Mansel, Thomas, 5th Baronet
Mansel, Thomas, 5th Baronet
Mansel, Thomas, 5th Baronet
Tory MPs (pre-1834)
Mansel, Thomas, 5th Baronet
High Sheriffs of Glamorgan
English MPs 1689–1690
English MPs 1690–1695
English MPs 1695–1698
English MPs 1698–1700
English MPs 1701
English MPs 1701–1702
English MPs 1702–1705
English MPs 1705–1707